Alka Sadat ((born 1988) is an Afghan documentary and feature film producer, director and cameraman. She became famous with her first 25-minute film Half Value Life,  which highlights social injustice and crime; the film won several awards. She is the younger sister of Roya Sadat, the first Afghan woman film producer and director. The two sisters have collaborated in many film productions from 2004 and were instrumental in establishing the Roya Film House. For her first film she received the Afghan Peace Prize and since then has made many documentaries for which she has won many international awards as a producer, cameraman, and director and also for her work in Television. Both had participated in the "Muslim World: A Short-Film Festival", organized at the Los Angeles Film School, where 32 films from Afghanistan were featured. In 2013, she coordinated in holding the first Afghanistan International Women's Film Festival. Her contribution to film making so far is in 15 documentaries and one short fiction feature film.

Bibliography

Alka Sadat was born in 1988 in Herat, Afghanistan at a time when the Taliban regime was in force. In view of the severe restrictions imposed by the Taliban on the freedom of woman in education and social life, her mother boldly decided to educate all her six daughters at home. Alka Sadat then started assisting her sister Roya Sadat as costume designer in making the fiction film Three Dots, a 60-minute film which highlights tribulations of a widow trying to make a living in an atmosphere of drug peddling that prevailed in the country. Her sister then advised her to make documentaries. As Alka Sadat had no experience in making the documentaries she went through a 14-day training programme conducted by the German Goethe Institute at Kabul before venturing to make documentaries.

Her first 25-minute short documentary film titled Half-Value Life  was made during 2008. The film highlights the role of Maria Bashir, the first women's rights activist. Bashir acts in her real life role of an Afghan woman public prosecutor from Herat Province dealing with the underworld people involved in crime and drug peddling. Some of the scenes presented in the documentary relate to family battering and rape cases of child brides. For this film she won several awards at the London Feminist Film Festival 2013's film festival. As director, in 2005, Sadat produced the film  We Are Post-modernist for Babak Payama & Roya Film House highlighting the plight of a 14-year-old girl in Afghanistan. During 2008–2009 she worked for the Pangea Foundation and produced A Woman Sings in the Desert, a documentary film. Sadat participated and presented her documentaries at the "Women's Voices Now Film Festival" held in Los Angeles in 2011.

Like her sister Roya, Alka Sadat produced many documentary films and was recipient of several awards at many international film festivals. She has directed many films focused on women's issues in Afghanistan. During 2012–2013, as script writer and director, she made three documentaries for the United Nations Assistance Mission in Afghanistan (UNAMA) in collaboration with Afghan Radio and television. These documentaries highlight the ten year efforts of UN and other agencies in reconstruction of Afghanistan. They highlight issues related to children on their rights, child marriage, labour and child  abuse. These documentaries also deal with rights of women and other social issues concerned with education,  police, drug addiction and so forth. She also produced a documentary titled Afghanistan Night Story, related to the elite commandos of Afghan Army. Another documentary released by her in 2015 is titled Afghanistan Women in 1393 Election (made in 2015) which highlights participation of women in the elections. The latest award she received was at the Aljazeera International Documentary Film Festival! 2011 on "Public Liberties & Human Rights".

Jury Member at Film Festivals 
2017: head of the jury in 18th Jeonju International Film Festival South Korea
2015: London Feminist Film Festival (UK)32
2015: 60 Second Film Festival  (Afghanistan)
2014: Afghanistan Student Film Festival (Afghanistan)
2013: Afghan Contemporary Art Prize (Afghanistan)
2011: Asiatica Film Festival (Italy Roma)

References

Living people
1981 births
Women in Afghanistan
Afghan women film directors
Afghan film directors
Afghan women film producers